Rafael Nadal defeated Nick Kyrgios in the final, 6–2, 6–1 to win the men's singles tennis title at the 2017 China Open. Nadal saved two match points en route to the title, in his first-round match against Lucas Pouille.

Andy Murray was the reigning champion, but withdrew with a hip injury before the tournament.

Seeds

Draw

Finals

Top half

Bottom half

Qualifying

Seeds

Qualifiers

Qualifying draw

First qualifier

Second qualifier

Third qualifier

Fourth qualifier

References

External links
 Main Draw
 Qualifying Draw

2017 China Open (tennis)